WGST (720 kHz) is a commercial AM radio station licensed to Hogansville, Georgia, and serving West Central Georgia, including LaGrange and Newnan. It airs a talk radio format and is owned by iHeartMedia, Inc.  Most programming on WGST is syndicated. It carries Premiere Networks shows from Sean Hannity, Glenn Beck and "Clay Travis & Buck Sexton." From the Salem Radio Network it carries Hugh Hewitt and Larry Elder. On weekends, sports programming from the Fox Sports Radio Network is heard. On weekdays, most hours begin with Fox News Radio.

WGST transmits with power of 7,970 watts, using a non-directional antenna, but because it shares AM 720, the same frequency as Class A clear-channel station WGN in Chicago, WGST is a daytimer, required to be off the air at night when AM radio waves travel farther.

History
The station was assigned the WMXY call sign on September 18, 1984; it signed on August 12, 1985, owned by Tharpe Communications and programming an urban contemporary format. Tharpe sold the station to T. Wood and Associates for $5,000 in 1991; L.A. Wood was a principal of both companies. Two years later, WMXY and its FM sister station, WEIZ, were sold to Magnolia Broadcasting for $200,000. Magnolia sold the stations to First Georgia Broadcasting, owner of WKZJ in Greenville, for $145,000 in 1995; the following year, First Georgia sold WVCC and what had become WZLG to Janz Broadcasting for $510,000.

Janz Broadcasting sold WMXY and WZLG to Radio LaGrange for $975,000 in 1997, with a local marketing agreement commencing on December 1; Radio LaGrange's principals owned WCOH in Newnan and WMKJ in Peachtree City. Jacor Communications announced a $4.4 million purchase of all four stations in January 1999; Jacor was itself acquired by Clear Channel Communications (now iHeartMedia) a few months later. WMXY changed its call sign to WGSE on July 12, 1999, accompanied by a switch to a news/talk format; the previous call sign was moved to WKBN-FM in Youngstown, Ohio. The call sign was changed to WVCC on December 22, 2003, and to WGST on July 13, 2020.

References

External links

GST
Radio stations established in 1985
1985 establishments in Georgia (U.S. state)
IHeartMedia radio stations
GST
Talk radio stations in the United States